Liam Cort (born in 1989) is a basketball player for the Milton Keynes Lions, an English basketball team.  He progressed through the Milton Keynes Lions junior ranks and now 18 years old and still in school in Milton Keynes.  Liam Cort is in his first full professional season with the Lions senior team.

Because of his height (6 ft 3 in) Cort mainly plays guard, and is currently coming off the bench.

References 
Milton Keynes Lions Homepage

1989 births
Living people
London Lions (basketball) players